Paulo César da Silva Barrios (born 1 February 1980) is a Paraguayan professional footballer who plays for 12 de Octubre in Paraguay, as a centre-back.

He has previously played top-flight football in Paraguay, Italy, Argentina, England and Spain.

He played for the Paraguay national team from 2000 to 2017, and is their most-capped player of all time, earning over 100 caps. He played at two World Cups and three Copa América tournaments, helping his country finish as runners-up in the 2011 Copa América.

In 2015, da Silva became a naturalized Mexican citizen.

Club career

Early career
Born in Asunción, Da Silva started his career in the youth divisions of Atlántida Sport Club, arriving at the club at the age of 13. In 1996, da Silva reached the Primera División Paraguaya with Asunción team Presidente Hayes at the age of 16.

Mexico
Before joining Toluca, da Silva played for Perugia and Venezia of Italy, and Lanús of Argentina. He joined Toluca from Paraguayan Club Libertad for the 2003 Apertura. After making his debut, da Silva was a mainstay in Toluca's defence, starting all but one game that he has played and eventually becoming the team's captain due to his leadership on the field. In 2007, he was chosen for the "Ideal Eleven" squad of South America and in 2008 he led Toluca to the Apertura 2008 title, being chosen as the best overall player of the tournament by the Mexican media.

Sunderland
On 13 July 2009, Da Silva joined English club Sunderland on a three-year deal. Manager Steve Bruce said "I'm delighted to have signed a player of Paulo's experience. He is captain of his country and has played at the highest level in South America, so will bring leadership qualities to our side." His arrival at the Stadium of Light was followed by a long and confusing period in regards to his visa application. Da Silva was granted a work permit to play in England almost immediately, but had to wait for over a month to get his visa before it was eventually granted on 12 August.

He made his debut on 24 August against Norwich City in the League Cup second round, playing the whole 90 minutes of a 4–1 away win. On 12 September he made his first Premier League appearance, replacing Steed Malbranque for the final ten minutes of a 4–1 home win over Hull City.

Da Silva was rotated throughout his first season at the club, but performed consistently when required. Manager Steve Bruce cited 'settlement' as the reason behind playing Da Silva in phases, stating he needed time to adjust to the English game and lifestyle. He was joined at the club by his international teammate Cristian Riveros in May 2010. Da Silva's second season at Sunderland saw him make just three appearances, only one as a starter. His last appearance for Sunderland came in their home defeat to Notts County in the FA Cup on 8 January 2011.

Real Zaragoza
Da Silva joined Real Zaragoza from Sunderland on 31 January 2011 for an undisclosed fee, with his new club in 15th in La Liga at the time. They finished the season in 13th.

Toluca
Da Silva re-joined Toluca on 31 May 2013 in a two-year loan deal from Pachuca.

On 11 May 2015, Toluca announced they had signed da Silva permanently.

In December 2015, da Silva received a Mexican naturalization to disoccupy a foreign place in Toluca's team.

Return to Paraguay
On 26 June 2017, Da Silva returned to Paraguay to play for Club Libertad

In March 2020, da Silva stated that he wanted to retire at Atlántida Asunción.

In December 2021, the 41-year-old da Silva announced that the 2022 season would be his last.

International career

In 1994, da Silva was selected for the Paraguay U17 national team barely aged 14.

In 2000, da Silva represented Paraguay U23 at the 2000 CONMEBOL Men Pre-Olympic Tournament.

He played for Paraguay in 1997 and 1999 FIFA World Youth Championship, but missed the 2002 World Cup in Korea and Japan. However, he was named in the 23-man squad for the 2006 World Cup in Germany. He also played at the 2010 World Cup in South Africa, featuring in all five of Paraguay's games in their run to the quarter-finals, and provided an assist for Sunderland teammate Cristian Riveros in their 2–0 win against Slovakia in the group stages.

Personal life
In December 2015, da Silva became a Mexican citizen.

Career statistics
Scores and results list Paraguay's goal tally first, score column indicates score after each da Silva goal.

Honours
Libertad
Primera División de Paraguay: 2002, 2003

Toluca
CONCACAF Champions' Cup: 2003
Primera División de México: 2005 Apertura, 2008 Apertura
Campeón de Campeones: 2003, 2006

Individual
Chosen on the CONMEBOL Best Eleven team: 2007
Best player of the Primera División de México: 2008

See also 
 List of men's footballers with 100 or more international caps

References

External links
 Real Zaragoza official profile 
 
 
 
 2010 FIFA World Cup profile
 
 

1980 births
Living people
Sportspeople from Asunción
Paraguayan footballers
Association football defenders
Paraguayan Primera División players
Cerro Porteño players
Club Libertad footballers
Serie A players
Serie B players
A.C. Perugia Calcio players
Venezia F.C. players
Cosenza Calcio 1914 players
Argentine Primera División players
Club Atlético Lanús footballers
Liga MX players
Deportivo Toluca F.C. players
Premier League players
Sunderland A.F.C. players
La Liga players
Real Zaragoza players
C.F. Pachuca players
12 de Octubre Football Club players
Paraguay under-20 international footballers
Paraguay international footballers
2006 FIFA World Cup players
2007 Copa América players
2010 FIFA World Cup players
2011 Copa América players
2015 Copa América players
Copa América Centenario players
Paraguayan expatriate footballers
Expatriate footballers in Italy
Expatriate footballers in Argentina
Expatriate footballers in Mexico
Expatriate footballers in England
Expatriate footballers in Spain
FIFA Century Club
Paraguayan expatriate sportspeople in Italy
Paraguayan expatriate sportspeople in Argentina
Paraguayan expatriate sportspeople in Mexico
Paraguayan expatriate sportspeople in England
Paraguayan expatriate sportspeople in Spain
Atlántida Sport Club players